Stefano Evodio Assemani (15 April 171124 November 1782), Ottoman-born orientalist, nephew of Giuseppe Simone Assemani and cousin of Giuseppe Luigi Assemani, was the chief assistant of his uncle Giuseppe Simone in his work in the Vatican library.

Career
He was titular archbishop of Apamea in Syria, and held several rich prebends in Italy. His literary labours were very extensive. His two most important works were a description of certain valuable manuscripts in his Bibliothecae Mediceo-Laurentianae et Palatinae codd. manuscr. Orientalium Catalogus (Flor. 1742), fol., and his Acta SS. Martyrum Orientalium.

He made several translations from the Syriac, and in conjunction with his uncle he began the Bibliothecae Apostol. Vatic. codd. manusc. Catal., in tres partes distributus. Only three volumes were published, and the fire in the Vatican library in 1768 consumed the manuscript collections which had been prepared for the continuation of the work.

Works

Notes

References 
 
 
 Giorgio Levi della Vida, «ASSEMANI, Stefano Evodio». In: Dizionario Biografico degli Italiani, Volume IV, Rome: Istituto dell'Enciclopedia Italiana, 1962

1711 births
1782 deaths
Roman Catholic titular archbishops
Orientalists from the Ottoman Empire
Syriacists
Maronites from the Ottoman Empire
Emigrants from the Ottoman Empire to Italy